The Associated Press NFL Offensive Player of the Year Award (OPOY) is given annually by the Associated Press (AP) to the offensive player in the National Football League (NFL) deemed to have had the most outstanding season. The winner is chosen by votes from a nationwide panel of sportswriters who regularly follow the NFL. Multiple-time awardees include Marshall Faulk and Earl Campbell, both of whom won the award three times, each consecutively. Jerry Rice, Barry Sanders, Tom Brady, Terrell Davis, Drew Brees, and Peyton Manning have each won the award twice. The award is currently held by wide receiver Justin Jefferson of the Minnesota Vikings, who received it for the 2022 NFL season after being on pace to break Calvin Johnson record for most receiving yards in a single season in NFL history with 127 receptions, 8 touchdowns and 1,809 yards.

Every winner of the award has been either a running back or a quarterback, with the exception of wide receivers Jerry Rice, Michael Thomas, Cooper Kupp, and Justin Jefferson  Running backs have been awarded 26 times, followed by quarterbacks, with 20 awards. Of the 49 winners, 28 were also named the AP NFL Most Valuable Player in the same season. Since 2011, both awards have been given out at the annual NFL Honors ceremony along with other AP awards, including the AP NFL Defensive Player of the Year Award and AP NFL Offensive and Defensive Rookie of the Year Awards.

Players are often awarded after record-breaking or near-record-breaking offensive seasons. Running back O. J. Simpson won the award for 1973 after rushing for a record 2,003 yards, becoming the first NFL player to rush for 2,000 yards in a season. When his record was broken by Eric Dickerson in 1984, Dickerson placed second in voting behind quarterback Dan Marino, who that year was the first to pass for 5,000 yards in a season. Marino's 5,084 yards stood as the record for 27 years before being broken by Drew Brees in 2011, who won that season's award. In turn, 2013 winner Peyton Manning set league single-season records for passing yards (5,477) and passing touchdowns (55).

Winners

See also
 Associated Press NFL Offensive Rookie of the Year Award
 Associated Press NFL Defensive Player of the Year Award
 FedEx Air & Ground NFL Players of the Year
 Kansas City Committee of 101 AFC and NFC Offensive Players of the Year
 National Football League Offensive Player of the Year Award, overview of all NFL Offensive Player of the Year awards

References
General
 
 

Footnotes

National Football League trophies and awards
Associated Press awards
Awards established in 1972
National Football League Offensive Player of the Year Award winners